The 72nd parallel south is a circle of latitude that is 72 degrees south of the Earth's equatorial plane in the Antarctic. The parallel passes through the Southern Ocean and Antarctica.

Around the world
Starting at the Prime Meridian and heading eastwards, the parallel 72° south passes through:

{| class="wikitable plainrowheaders"
! scope="col" width="125" | Co-ordinates
! scope="col" | Continent or ocean
! scope="col" | Notes
|-
| 
! scope="row" rowspan="5" | Antarctica
| Queen Maud Land, claimed by 
|-
| 
| Western Australian Antarctic Territory, claimed by 
|-
| 
| Adélie Land, claimed by 
|-
| 
| Eastern Australian Antarctic Territory, claimed by 
|-
| 
| Ross Dependency, claimed by 
|-
| style="background:#b0e0e6;" | 
! scope="row" style="background:#b0e0e6;" | Southern Ocean
| style="background:#b0e0e6;" | Ross Sea, south of the Pacific Ocean
|-
| 
! scope="row" | Antarctica
| Thurston Island, off coast Ellsworth Land, unclaimed territory
|-
| style="background:#b0e0e6;" | 
! scope="row" style="background:#b0e0e6;" | Southern Ocean
| style="background:#b0e0e6;" | Bellingshausen Sea, south of the Pacific Ocean
|-
| 
! scope="row" | Antarctica
|-
| style="background:#b0e0e6;" | 
! scope="row" style="background:#b0e0e6;" | Southern Ocean
| style="background:#b0e0e6;" | Weddell Sea, south of the Atlantic Ocean
|-
| 
! scope="row" | Antarctica
| Queen Maud Land, claimed by 
|}

See also
71st parallel south
73rd parallel south

s72